Balwant Rai Mehta Vidya Bhawan Senior Secondary School  is a co-educational high school in the Lajpat Nagar neighborhood of south Delhi, India. The second branch of the school was opened at Majid Moth near Greater Kailash-II.

History
The Servants of the People Society established the school during the 1960s. The school participates in the All India Secondary School Examination conducted by the Central Board of Secondary Education. It also has special classes and integrated education for students with cognitive deficit and hearing impairment. Most students are from the neighborhoods of south Delhi, including Lajpat Nagar, Amar Colony, Dayanand Colony, East of Kailash, Greater Kailash Part I and II,

See also
Education in India
Education in Delhi
List of schools in Delhi
 CBSE

References

External links

Schools in Delhi